It Rains on Our Love is a 1946 Swedish drama film directed by Ingmar Bergman from the screenplay written by Herbert Grevenius and Bergman, based on the Norwegian play Bra Mennesker (Good People) by Oskar Braaten.  It Rains on Our Love is the first film directed by Bergman to include actor Gunnar Björnstrand in a credited role (he also had a credited role in Bergman's screenwriting debut Torment (1944)).  Björnstrand would go on to act in nearly twenty of Bergman's films.

Plot
David Lindell (Birger Malmsten) and Maggi (Barbro Kollberg) are not lucky. David landed in prison, but now wants to start a new life. Maggi aimed to be an actress, but got pregnant during a chance encounter and has now fled to a provincial town to give herself a second chance. The lovers represent everything the straitlaced society rejects. Yet even when people take advantage of them, when the couple are accused of theft, when they are thrown out of their apartment – at least they seem to have a guardian angel, who appears in the unlikely form of the “Man with the Umbrella”.

Cast
 Barbro Kollberg as Maggi
 Birger Malmsten as David
 Gösta Cederlund as Man with umbrella
 Ludde Gentzel as Håkansson
 Douglas Håge as Andersson
 Benkt-Åke Benktsson as The Prosecutor
 Sture Ericson as Kängsnöret
 Ulf Johansson as Stålvispen
 Julia Cæsar as Hanna Ledin
 Gunnar Björnstrand as Mr. Purman
 Erik Rosén as The Judge
 Magnus Kesster as Folke Törnberg
 Åke Fridell as Reverend

References

External links

1946 films
1946 drama films
Films directed by Ingmar Bergman
Films with screenplays by Ingmar Bergman
Swedish black-and-white films
Swedish drama films
1940s Swedish-language films
1940s Swedish films